The Transvaal was a wooden barque cargo ship of the Rennie line. In December 1874 on her maiden voyage from London she dragged anchor and was driven ashore south of the Umgeni River in South Africa, causing 12 deaths.

References

Further reading
"Rennie's Steamer Service: Natal and Cape Colonies" by R. N. Porter, The South African Philatelist, Vol. 90, No. 6 (December 2014), Whole No. 927, pp. 178–182.
 Ingpen, B. &  Ingrid Staude-Griesel (Ed.) (2000) Horizons: The Story of Rennies, 1849-1999. Johannesburg: Rennies Management Services. 

1874 ships